The Academic Cooperation Association (ACA) is an international think tank in the area of international cooperation in higher education. Since 1993, ACA has worked to promote innovation and internationalisation of European higher education in collaboration with its pan-European network of member organisations, each responsible in their respective countries for supporting internationalisation in education and training. ACA also maintains a global perspective through its associate members in other parts of the world.

ACA’s activities include research and analysis, evaluations, consultancy for private and public bodies, advocacy and publications. The Academic Cooperation Association’s Secretariat is located in Brussels — a privileged position to create and maintain close working relations to the European institutions.

Administrative Council

ACA History 
ACA was founded in June 1993 by the British Council, the German Academic Exchange Service (DAAD) and the Netherlands Organization for International Cooperation in Higher Education (NUFFIC). These organisations supported, and still support, on behalf of their governments, bilateral international cooperation of their countries' higher education institutions. They felt the need for a common European platform as the importance and number of European Union (EU) programmes in education and training was growing.

ACA membership soon expanded. In tribute to the EU enlargement and with a view to promote the setting up of independent internationalisation agencies in Central and Eastern Europe, full membership was extended from the EU and EFTA countries to the whole of Europe in 1998.

Throughout its history, ACA has provided the European Commission and other international bodies with background research on issues of international cooperation in higher education. In 1999, the association started its own publication series, the ACA Papers on International Cooperation in Higher Education.

ACA Members

ACA Publications

ACA Papers on International Cooperation in Education 
In 1999, ACA started its own monograph series, the ACA Papers on International Cooperation in Education which are published by Lemmens Medien in Bonn, Germany. Most of the books emerged from ACA's projects in the field of analysis and research on internationalisation of higher education. Examples of the ACA Papers are: 
 International Student Support in European Higher Education. Needs, Solutions, and Challenges (2010)
 English-Taught Programmes in European Higher Education. The Picture in 2007 (2008)
 The Professional Value of ERASMUS Mobility. The Impact of International Experience on Former Students' and on Teachers' Careers (2009).

Other Publications on Internationalisation of Higher Education 
ACA also publishes the ACA Newsletter – Education Europe, a monthly newsletter which provides policy-makers and practitioners world-wide with concise and up-to-date information on the developments in higher education policy at the national, European and global level. It also highlights important events, presents recent research on education and training matters and informs on the latest European Union funding opportunities.

Apart from the ACA Papers series, ACA Think Pieces and the ACA Newsletter, ACA publishes also a collection of reference works about trends and data of internationalisation in Europe and around the world. Examples are 
the EUA/ACA Internationalisation Handbook (2010), Handbook of International Associations in Higher Education (2009), and EURODATA – Student Mobility in European Higher Education (2006).

List of ACA Presidents 
 Ulrich Grothus (2018 - present), Former Deputy Secretary-General, German Academic Exchange Service (DAAD)
 Sijbolt Noorda (2011–2017), President, Association of Universities in the Netherlands (VSNU)
 Rolf Tarrach (2008–2011), Rector, University of Luxembourg
 Sir Peter Scott (2002–2008), Vice-Chancellor, University of Kingston
 Konstantinos Kerameus (1996–2002), Professor, University of Athens, School of Law
 Eduardo Marçal Grilo (1993–1995), Member of the Board of Trustees, Calouste Gulbenkian Foundation, Lisbon

References

1993 establishments in Belgium
Higher education organisations based in Europe
Think tanks established in 1993
Think tanks based in Belgium